Statistics in the European Union are collected by Eurostat (European statistics body).

Area and population

As of 1 January 2006, the population of the EU was about 493 million people, although in 2020 the EU lost over 10% of its population as a result of the UK leaving the bloc. Many countries are expected to experience a decline in population over the coming decades, though this could be offset with new countries planning to join the EU within the next 20 years. The most populous member state is Germany, with an estimated 80.4 million people. France and Ireland have the highest birth-rates. The most densely populated country is the island of Malta, which is also the smallest, while the largest in area is France. The least densely populated country is Finland.

Population figures in the table below are from 2006 or 2007 estimates. The highest and lowest figures in each column have been marked in bold.

Economy
For statistics relating to economy, please see Economy of the European Union.

EU budget
The primary resource for funding the European Union is the contributions sought from member states. Each member state contributes to the EU budget, and receives funding back from the EU, depending on the relative wealth of the states, i.e. their ability to pay.

The table below shows the contributions as a percentage of the total budget. This takes into account the special considerations given to the United Kingdom to reduce its contribution through a rebate. Expenditure in Luxembourg, Belgium and France include items for the EU administrative centres in each of those countries.

Economic and governance-related rankings
There are many indices available on issues such as corruption, development, and freedom. The rankings below include all EU member states, EU candidates (with the exception of Turkey, cause their accession negotiations have stalled since 2016) and EFTA countries.

Freedom of the press

Reporters sans frontières (Reporters Without Borders) conducts an annual survey on the freedom of the press and produces scores (not shown here) for each country, resulting in the Press Freedom Index. In 2019 and 2020, Finland was proclaimed as having the freest press in the European Union, and the second in the world behind Norway. Bulgaria was ranked as having the least free press in the European Union in 2019 and 2020.

Economic freedom

An index of Economic Freedom is produced by The Wall Street Journal and the Heritage Foundation. It uses 50 different variables to compile the survey, in areas such as trade policy and government intervention.

A similar index produced by the World Economic Forum is its Global Competitiveness Index.

Source: 2020 Index of Economic Freedom.

Perception of corruption

Transparency International is an international NGO publishing an annual Global Corruption Report indicating the perception of corruption
around the world. The rankings of the table refer to the Corruption Perceptions Index 2022 . A high ranking means low corruption.

Human development

The Human Development Index is a measure produced by the United Nations which covers three aspects of human development:
 poverty (GDP per capita)
 education (mean years of schooling and expected years of schooling)
 health (life expectancy)
The rankings of the table refer to the UNDP Human Development Report 2019 (2018 data). The UN lists all EU member states as countries with very high human development.

Democracy Index

The Democracy Index is an index compiled by the Economist Intelligence Unit (EIU), the research division of the Economist Group, a UK-based private company which publishes the weekly newspaper The Economist.

See also

Enlargement of the European Union
Largest cities of the European Union by population within city limits
Hispanics and Latins in Europe
List of European Union member states by population
Largest urban areas of the European Union and Larger Urban Zones
Organization for Security and Co-operation in Europe statistics

References

External links
Eurostat – Statistics Explained
Health-EU Portal Health Statistics
 EU Budget Data